Pretty for the People is an album by American jazz composer and arranger A. K. Salim featuring Kenny Dorham and Johnny Griffin recorded in 1957 for the Savoy label.

Reception

Allmusic awarded the album 3 stars

Track listing
All compositions by A. K. Salim
 "Blu-Binsky" - 6:12
 "R.U.1.2." - 8:00
 "Shirley Ray" - 6:03
 "Ba-Lu-Ee-Du" - 5:48
 "Pretty for the People" - 8:05
 "Takin' Care of Business" - 5:24
 "Blu-Binsky" [Alternate Take] - 6:02 Bonus track on CD reissue
 "Pretty for the People" [Alternate Take] - 8:29 Bonus track on CD reissue

Personnel 
A. K. Salim - arranger, director
Kenny Dorham - trumpet
Buster Cooper - trombone
Johnny Griffin - tenor saxophone
Pepper Adams - baritone saxophone, tenor saxophone
Wynton Kelly - piano
Paul Chambers - bass
Max Roach - drums 
Chino Pozo - congas

References 

1958 albums
A. K. Salim albums
Savoy Records albums
Albums produced by Ozzie Cadena
Albums recorded at Van Gelder Studio